Girolamo Magnesi (died 1644) was a Roman Catholic prelate who served as Bishop of Potenza (1634–1644).

Biography
On 7 July 1634, Girolamo Magnesi was selected as Bishop of Potenza and confirmed by Pope Urban VIII on 20 November 1634. On 30 November 1634, he was consecrated bishop by Carlo Emanuele Pio di Savoia, Cardinal-Bishop of Porto e Santa Rufina, with Giovanni Battista Altieri, Bishop Emeritus of Camerino, and Girolamo Parisani, Bishop of Polignano, serving as co-consecrators. He served as Bishop of Potenza until his death in 1644.

References

External links and additional sources
 (for Chronology of Bishops) 
 (for Chronology of Bishops)  

17th-century Italian Roman Catholic bishops
Bishops appointed by Pope Urban VIII
1644 deaths